Silke-Beate Knoll (born 21 February 1967 in Rottweil) is a former German track and field athlete and participant in the Olympic Games who had success in the 1980s and 1990s as a sprinter.

Her first success was the 1986 German junior title over 200 metres. As part of the 4 × 200 metres relay team of the SC Eintracht Hamm, she set a world indoor record in 1988.

Her greatest successes were the bronze medal in the 4 × 100 metres relay race at the 1995 World Championships (together with Melanie Paschke, Silke Lichtenhagen and Gabriele Becker) and the gold medal at the 1994 European Championships in the same event (together with Melanie Paschke, Bettina Zipp and Silke Lichtenhagen). She placed fourth in the individual 200 metre sprint.

Knoll was a member of the German national team at many important international meetings until 1996. She entered the 200 metre sprint at the 1988 Olympic Games in Seoul but was eliminated in the semi-final. She won the silver medal at the 1990 European Championships in the 4 × 100 m relay. She came fifth in the 200 metre sprint. At the 1992 Olympic Games she came fourth in the 4 × 100 m relay and reached the semi-final in the 200 metre sprint. Her third entry at the Olympic Games in 1996 was ill-fated; the 4 × 100 m relay team did not manage to carry the baton to the finish line.

Knoll may not have been in the limelight as much as some other athletes, but few can match her 22 German championship titles. She competed for the MTV Celle, from 1987 to 1989 for SC Eintracht Hamm, then for LG Olympia Dortmund. While she was still competing, she was 1.63 metres tall and weighed 52 kilograms. She ended her athletics career in 1997.

International competitions

References
 
 

1967 births
Living people
People from Rottweil (district)
Sportspeople from Freiburg (region)
West German female sprinters
German female sprinters
German national athletics champions
Olympic athletes of West Germany
Athletes (track and field) at the 1988 Summer Olympics
Olympic athletes of Germany
Athletes (track and field) at the 1992 Summer Olympics
Athletes (track and field) at the 1996 Summer Olympics
World Athletics Championships athletes for West Germany
World Athletics Championships athletes for Germany
World Athletics Championships medalists
European Athletics Championships medalists
World record setters in athletics (track and field)
SC Eintracht Hamm athletes
LG Olympia Dortmund athletes
Universiade bronze medalists for West Germany
Universiade medalists in athletics (track and field)
Medalists at the 1989 Summer Universiade
Olympic female sprinters